Megabite may refer to:

 Megabites, a feature column, restaurant reviews in the Hong Kong newspaper bc magazine
 Megabite Project, an online companion event to the 2002 edition of the Next Wave Festival
 MegaBITE, volume 3 of the manga Adventure Kid
 Megabite (A Split-Second album), 1995
Megabite (P.E.A.C.E album), 2004
 IDT Megabite Cafe, cybercafe and sushibar in NYC

See also
 Megabyte (disambiguation)
 Megabyte (MB) 106 bytes
 Mebibyte (MiB) 220 bytes
 Megabit (Mbit) 106 bits
 Mebibit (Mibit) 220 bits
 Mega (disambiguation)
 Bite (disambiguation)